Aich (also spelled as Aitch) is a Hindu Bengali surname.  Notable people with the surname include:

Manohar Aich (1912–2016), Indian bodybuilder
Prodosh Aich (born 1933), retired Bengali-Indian professor, author of several books 

Kayastha
Social groups of West Bengal